The Roman Catholic Diocese of Anápolis is a diocese located in the city of Anápolis in the Ecclesiastical province of Goiânia in Brazil.

History
 October 11, 1966: Established as Diocese of Anápolis from the Metropolitan Archdiocese of Goiânia

Bishops
 Bishops of Anápolis (Latin Church)
 Epaminondas José de Araújo (27 Oct 1966  – 5 Jun 1978), appointed Bishop of Palmeira dos Índios, Alagoas
 Manuel Pestana Filho (30 Nov 1978  – 9 Jun 2004)
 João Casimiro Wilk, O.F.M. Conv. (9 Jun 2004 – present)

Auxiliary bishop
Dilmo Franco de Campos (2019-)

References
 GCatholic.org
 Catholic Hierarchy
  Diocese website (Portuguese)

Roman Catholic dioceses in Brazil
Christian organizations established in 1966
Anápolis, Roman Catholic Diocese of
Roman Catholic dioceses and prelatures established in the 20th century